The following is a partial list of eponymous roads in Winnipeg - that is, roads named after people - with notes on the link between the road and the person.

 Milt Stegall Drive Manitoba
Chief Peguis Trail
Hespeler Avenue
Johnson Avenue
Marion Street
Goulet Street
Bishop Grandin Boulevard

See also
 List of eponymous streets in New York City
 List of eponymous roads in London

References

External links

Roads in Winnipeg
Transport in Winnipeg
Winnipeg